The 2012–13 Biathlon World Cup – World Cup 3 was held in Pokljuka, Slovenia, from 13 December until 16 December 2012.

Schedule of events

Medal winners

Men

Women

Achievements

 Best performance for all time

 , 6th place in Sprint
 , 25th place in Sprint
 , 30th place in Sprint and 25th in Pursuit
 , 41st place in Sprint
 , 50th place in Sprint and Pursuit
 , 95th place in Sprint
 , 2nd place in Pursuit
 , 10th place in Pursuit
 , 1st place in Sprint
 , 3rd place in Sprint
 , 12th place in Sprint
 , 21st place in Sprint
 , 30th place in Sprint
 , 56th place in Sprint and 45th place in Pursuit
 , 58th place in Sprint and 57th place in Pursuit
 , 1st place in Pursuit
 , 48th place in Pursuit

 First World Cup race

 , 17th place in Sprint
 , 98th place in Sprint
 , 59th place in Sprint

References 

- World Cup 3
Biathlon World Cup - World Cup 3
Biathlon competitions in Slovenia
December 2012 sports events in Europe